Charles "Charlie" H. Bott (born second ¼ 1941) is an English former rugby union, and professional rugby league footballer who played in the 1960s and 1970s.

Background
Charlie Bott was born in Doncaster, West Riding of Yorkshire, England.

Club career
Bott started his rugby career as a rugby union footballer with Old Thornensians RUFC (Thorne, Doncaster) before moving to rugby league, joining Oldham in 1962. In May 1967, he transferred to Salford.

In 1969, he played in the Challenge Cup Final at Wembley Stadium against Castleford, which Salford lost 6–11. He played his final game for Salford against Halifax on 25 April 1971, in which he scored the only goal of his career with a conversion in front of the posts.

International honours
Bott won a cap for Great Britain while at Oldham in 1966 against France.

References

External links
!Great Britain Statistics at englandrl.co.uk (statistics currently missing due to not having appeared for both Great Britain, and England)
(archived by web.archive.org) Statistics at orl-heritagetrust.org.uk

1941 births
Living people
English rugby league players
English rugby union players
Great Britain national rugby league team players
Oldham R.L.F.C. players
Rugby league players from Doncaster
Rugby union players from Doncaster
Rugby league props
Salford Red Devils players